William Wallace McDowell (January 22, 1867 – April 9, 1934), known as W. W. McDowell, was an American politician in the state of Montana who also served as United States minister to the Irish Free State.

Montana
McDowell was born in Trenton, Tennessee, and came to Montana in 1896. He served in the Montana House of Representatives from 1908 to 1913, and was Speaker from 1909 to 1913. He served as Lieutenant Governor of Montana from 1913 to 1921.

Ireland
In September 1933, McDowell was appointed to serve as minister to the Irish Free State by president Franklin D. Roosevelt; he was reappointed in January 1934, as his initial appointment had occurred during a recess of the Senate. Upon presenting his credentials to Irish leaders on March 27, 1934, his official title was Envoy Extraordinary and Minister Plenipotentiary. Two weeks later, he died of a sudden heart attack on April 9, 1934, while attending a banquet in Dublin.

Personal life
McDowell's wife died in Chicago in November 1933, prior to McDowell moving to Ireland; the couple had married in 1912. After McDowell's death in Dublin several months later, his body was returned to the United States and he was buried in Memphis, Tennessee.

References

External links

1867 births
1934 deaths
Lieutenant Governors of Montana
Speakers of the Montana House of Representatives
Democratic Party members of the Montana House of Representatives
Ambassadors of the United States to Ireland
People from Trenton, Tennessee